Bowes House is a historic home located at Huntington Bay in Suffolk County, New York. It was built in 1899 and is a -story, four-bay shingled gable roofed residence in the Shingle Style.  A recessed porch on flared Doric order columns wraps around the first floor.

It was added to the National Register of Historic Places in 1985.

References

Houses on the National Register of Historic Places in New York (state)
Houses completed in 1899
Shingle Style houses
Houses in Suffolk County, New York
National Register of Historic Places in Suffolk County, New York
Shingle Style architecture in New York (state)